is a Japanese retired sprinter who specialized in the 400 metres. He competed in the 4 × 400 metres relay at the 2001 World Championships. He is currently the director of track and field club at Surugadai University.

Personal best

International competition

References

External links

1979 births
Living people
Japanese male sprinters
Sportspeople from Osaka Prefecture
World Athletics Championships athletes for Japan
Universiade medalists in athletics (track and field)
Universiade bronze medalists for Japan
Medalists at the 2001 Summer Universiade
Hosei University alumni
Japanese athletics coaches
21st-century Japanese people